Corderman is a surname. Notable people with the surname include:

 John P. Corderman (1942–2012), American politician
 Paul D. Corderman (born 1971), American politician
 Preston Corderman (1904–1998), United States Army general